The French Way (literally the "way of the Franks") is the GR 65 and the most popular of the routes of the  Way of St. James, the ancient pilgrimage route to Santiago de Compostela in Galicia, Spain. It runs from Saint-Jean-Pied-de-Port on the French side of the Pyrenees to Roncesvalles on the Spanish side and then another 780 km on to Santiago de Compostela through the major cities of Pamplona, Logroño, Burgos and León. A typical walk on the Camino francés takes at least four weeks, allowing for one or two rest days on the way. Some travel the Camino on bicycle or on horseback.

Paths from the cities of Tours, Vézelay, and Le Puy-en-Velay meet at Saint-Jean-Pied-de-Port. A fourth French route originates in Arles, in Provence, and crosses the French–Spanish frontier at a different point, between the Pyrenees towns of Somport and Canfranc. This fourth route follows the Aragonese Way and joins the French Way at Puente la Reina, south of Pamplona, in Navarre, about 700 kilometres from Santiago de Compostela.

In 2017 roughly 60% of pilgrims traveled to Santiago de Compostela via the French Way according to statistics gathered by the Pilgrim's Office in Santiago. In 1993, the French Way, along with the Spanish route of the Camino de Santiago was inscribed on the UNESCO World Heritage List for its historical importance in Christianity as a major pilgrimage route and its testimony to the exchange of ideas and cultures across its length.

Example itinerary
Though there is no set itinerary for this route, daily stages from major town to major town could be walked as follows:

Films
 The Way (2010)

References

External links

 the French Way - Google Maps
 A photo tour of the Camino Frances (2010)
 Free Guide for Hikers on the French Way
 the French Way - Google Maps TODO MENTIRA
 http://ngm.nationalgeographic.com/2015/05/the-way/george-photography 

Camino de Santiago routes
Hiking trails in Spain